Siphona variata is a Palearctic species of fly in the family Tachinidae.

Distribution
United Kingdom.

References

Tachininae
Diptera of Europe
Insects described in 1982